Maria Ripoll Julià (born 1963) is a Spanish film director from Barcelona, with an international background and eight feature films to her credit.
The success of her film It's Now or Never has placed her as the highest-grossing female film director in Spanish history.

Early life and career beginnings  
Born in Barcelona, Ripoll studied screenwriting in Los Angeles at the American Film Institute (AFI), where she shot the  short film Kill Me Later.

Directing career  

Her first feature-length film, The Man with Rain in His Shoes starring Lena Headey, Douglas Henshall and Penélope Cruz won Best Screenplay at the Montreal World Film Festival, the Audience Award at the Sitges Film Festival, the Seattle Women’s Film Festival.  It led to Ripoll being nominated for a Goya Award for Best New Director.

She then directed Tortilla Soup in Los Angeles starring Hector Elizondo, Jacqueline Obradors, Raquel Welch and Elizabeth Peña. Produced by Samuel Goldwyn Jr, it was a noted success, breaking Latin American stereotypes on its way to nine nominations at the ALMA Awards. She then shot a documentary in New York, WITNESS: Cameras Against Violence,  for Canal Plus.

On her return to Spain, Ripoll shot her third feature film Utopia, which enters the terrain of the fantastic thriller and premiered in 2003. In Barcelona she then directed Your Life in 65, a film based on the play by Albert Espinosa. This film was invited to numerous festivals, including the AFI Los Angeles Film Festival and the Stockholm International Film Festival and was another success in Spain.
For Televisión Española (TVE) she directed Fame, Everything for a Dream and then turned to producing as well as directing Chromosome 5, a documentary for TVE. It was well received in Spain  and around the world, earning Best Picture in the Bosifest-Belgrade film festival amongst others.

In 2014 she directed the indie drama Traces of Sandalwood  starring Aina Clotet, a film shot in Mumbai and Barcelona in Hindi, English and Catalan. The film won the Gaudí Award in 2014 for best film and the Audience Award at the Montreal  and Cinequest Festivals.

Her next film, It's Now or Never premiered in June 2015. This romantic comedy starring Dani Rovira, Maria Valverde and Clara Lago was a summer blockbuster and turned Ripoll into Spain’s most successful  and highest-grossing female film director in Spanish history. The film has been screened at the Montreal, Toronto and Miami Films Festivals.

Her most recent film, the romantic comedy Don't Blame the Karma for Being an Idiot starring Verónica Echegui and Álex García, was based on the best-selling book with the same name.  It premiered in November 2016, reaching number 1 in Spain during its second week and screening at the Miami Film Festival in March 2017.

Selected filmography  
We Won't Kill Each Other with Guns (2022)
Live Twice, Love Once (2019)
Don't Blame the Karma for Being an Idiot (2016)
It's Now or Never (2015)
Traces of Sandalwood (2014)
Tortilla Soup (2001)
The Man with Rain in His Shoes (1998)

Awards and nominations

References

Further reading 
 "María Ripoll, the most profitable director of Spanish cinema" http://www.elespanol.com/cultura/cine/20161108/169233596_0.html |Spanish article  from 09.11.2016. Retrieved March 2, 2017
 "The miracle of María Ripoll, the highest grossing filmmaker in the history of our cinema" http://www.elconfidencial.com/cultura/cine/2015-07-30/el-milagro-de-la-directora-espanola-que-reventaba-taquillas_946878/ | Spanish article from 31.07.2015. Retrieved March 2, 2017
 "Now we can do our comedies without complexes" Interview with María Ripoll for LA VANGUARDIAhttp://www.lavanguardia.com/cine/20150619/54432914389/maria-ripoll-comedias-sin-complejos.html | Spanish article from 19.06.2015. Retrieved March 2, 2017
 "There are 39 dramatic stories according to mythology" Interview with María Ripoll for EL PAIS http://elpais.com/diario/1999/03/04/andalucia/920503353_850215.html | Spanish article from 04.03.1999. Retrieved March 2, 2017
 "Cinema is female!" Interview with filmmaker María Ripoll for women360 congress https://women360congress.com/entrevisa-maria-ripoll-directora-cine/| Spanish article from 04.03.1999. Retrieved March 2, 2017
 "Female directors are more careful to not fall into the too sugary farytale trap with Romantic Comedies" Interview with Maria Ripoll for digital magazine http://www.magazinedigital.com/personajes/sobre-ellos-ellas/maria-ripoll-son-bastante-quejicas | Spanish article from 04.03.1999. Retrieved March 2, 2017

External links 
 www.mariaripoll.com
 

Spanish women film directors
AFI Conservatory alumni
People from Barcelona
1964 births
Living people